"Close My Eyes" is an electronic song from Dutch techno and trance music DJ and producer Sander van Doorn. The song features Robbie Williams and production by Pet Shop Boys and Chris Zippel. The remix is of the original version of the song called "We're the Pet Shop Boys", a track recorded by Robbie Williams, featuring Pet Shop Boys, from his album Rudebox. The track peaked at number five on the U.S. Billboard Hot Dance Club Songs chart. An official music video exists.

Track listing
CD1
 "Close My Eyes" (UK radio edit) – 2:49
 "Close My Eyes" (original club version) – 7:24

CD2
 "Close My Eyes" (UK radio edit) – 2:49
 "Close My Eyes" (international radio edit) – 3:05
 "Close My Eyes" (original club version) – 7:24
 "Close My Eyes" (dub remix) – 6:08
 "Close My Eyes" (international video) – 3:05

Charts

References

2009 singles
Robbie Williams songs
2009 songs
Spinnin' Records singles